The Larry Craig scandal was an incident that began on June 11, 2007, with the arrest of Larry Craig, at the time a Republican United States Senator from Idaho, for lewd conduct in a men's restroom at the Minneapolis–St. Paul International Airport. On August 8 Craig entered a guilty plea to a lesser charge of disorderly conduct.

As a result of the controversy surrounding his arrest and guilty plea, and of pressure from fellow Republicans, at a news conference on September 1 Craig announced his intention to resign from the Senate, effective September 30. After subsequent failed efforts to withdraw his guilty plea, on October 4 he released a statement refusing to resign from the Senate. Craig did not run for re-election in 2008, and the incident effectively ended his political career.

Arrest

On June 11, 2007, Craig was arrested at the Minneapolis–Saint Paul International Airport on suspicion of disorderly conduct. The nature of the alleged activity has been categorized by some as cottaging. According to the police report, the police officer sat in a bathroom stall as part of an undercover operation investigating complaints of sexual activity in the restroom. After about 13 minutes of sitting in the stall, the police officer observed Craig lingering outside and frequently peeking through the crack of the door on the stall. Craig then entered the stall to the left of the officer's stall. The police officer made the following observations, which he recorded in his report of the incident, as to what happened next:

At 1216 hours, Craig tapped his right foot. I recognized this as a signal used by persons wishing to engage in lewd conduct. Craig tapped his toes several times and moves his foot closer to my foot.... The presence of others did not seem to deter Craig as he moved his right foot so that it touched the side of my left foot which was within my stall area. Craig then proceeded to swipe his left hand under the stall divider several times, with the palm of his hand facing upward.

According to the incident report and criminal complaint filed in court, the officer showed Craig his police identification beneath the partition separating their stalls, and the officer then pointed his finger towards the restroom exit. Craig initially said no, but he ultimately complied with the officer's request to leave the restroom. After Craig and the officer left the restroom, Craig was reluctant to go with the officer and demanded the officer show his police identification a second time. Once the officer complied with the request, Craig, the arresting officer, and a police detective, who was stationed outside of the restroom, went to the airport police station.

After the arresting officer read Craig his Miranda rights, the officer interviewed Craig about the restroom incident. At one point, Craig handed his business card to the arresting officer, which identified him as a U.S. Senator, and said to him, "What do you think about that?" Craig told the officer that he was worried about missing his flight, and the arresting officer asked the police detective to call the airline to hold the flight. The detective reported that no one answered the telephone for the airline, and the arresting officer proceeded with the interview.

According to the arrest report prepared by Sgt. Dave Karsnia, "Craig stated... He has a wide stance when going to the bathroom and that his foot may have touched mine." Craig never used the term "wide stance" himself. According to the transcript of the police interrogation, Sgt. Karsnia asked: "Did you do anything with your feet?" and Craig replied: "Positioned them, I don't know. I don't know at the time. I'm a fairly wide guy."

When the officer asked Craig about the use of his hands, Craig said that he reached down with his right hand to pick up a piece of paper that was on the floor. The officer disputed Craig's version by saying, "there was not a piece of paper on the bathroom floor, nor did Craig pick up a piece of paper." Craig also disputed the officer's assertion about the position of his hand, claiming that his right palm was faced down as he picked up the paper from the floor. The officer disputed Craig's version, alleging that Craig used his left hand because his thumb, "was positioned in a faceward motion." During the interview and in the incident report, the officer commented that Craig either disagreed with what happened in the restroom or could not recall the events as they happened.

Craig returned to the airport on June 22 to complain about how he had been treated by the police. According to the police report about Craig's return, Craig said he wanted information for his lawyer.

Craig pleaded guilty to a misdemeanor charge of disorderly conduct by signing and mailing a plea petition, dated August 1, 2007, to the Hennepin County District Court in Minnesota. He paid $575, including fines and fees. Senator Craig signed the petition to enter his guilty plea, which contained the provisions, "I understand that the court will not accept a plea of guilty from anyone who claims to be innocent... I now make no claim that I am innocent of the charge to which I am entering a plea of guilty." Craig mailed his signed petition to the court, and his petition to plead guilty to the misdemeanor charge was accepted and filed by the court on August 8, 2007.

Allegations about prior conduct become public
On October 17, 2006, gay rights activist Michael Rogers reported on sexual liaisons between Craig and unnamed individuals in Washington, DC's Union Station. Rogers uncovered a news story from 1982 that tied Craig to a sex and drug scandal in the US Congress. Rogers reported on more recent activity in various places throughout the nation. Rogers's report prompted Craig to issue a denial.
On August 27, 2007, Roll Call broke the story to reveal details about Craig's arrest at the Minneapolis–St. Paul Airport and his subsequent guilty plea in that case. After the conviction came to light, the Idaho Statesman published a story on August 28, 2007, about three allegations involving Craig's sexual conduct. A college student, who was considering pledging at Craig's fraternity at the University of Idaho in 1967, told a reporter for the Idaho Statesman that Craig led the student to his bedroom and, "made what the man said he took to be an invitation to sex." In the second reported incident, a man, who identified himself as gay, told a reporter that Craig cruised him at the REI store in Boise in November 1994, following him around the store for half an hour. The last reported incident to the Idaho Statesman about Craig's conduct came from a 40-year-old man with close ties to Republican officials. According to the man's story about the encounter with Craig, the man "reported having oral sex with Craig at Washington's Union Station, probably in 2004." A reporter for the Idaho Statesman interviewed Craig on August 28, 2007, regarding the allegations about his conduct, and in response to the reporter's questions, Craig said, "I'm not gay, and I don't cruise, and I don't hit on men.... I don't go around anywhere hitting on men, and by God, if I did, I wouldn't do it in Boise, Idaho! Jiminy!"

Responses to the arrest
Craig told the public that the officer misconstrued his actions, that he was not involved in any inappropriate conduct, and had failed to seek legal counsel: "In hindsight, I should not have pled guilty. I was trying to handle this matter myself quickly and expeditiously." In an August 28, 2007, press conference in Boise, Idaho, Craig said:

I am not gay. I never have been gay.... In June, I overreacted and made a poor decision. I chose to plead guilty to a lesser charge in hopes of making it go away.... Please let me apologize to my family, friends, and staff, and fellow Idahoans for the cloud placed over Idaho. I did nothing wrong at the Minneapolis airport. I did nothing wrong, and I regret the decision to plead guilty and the sadness that decision has brought on my wife, on my family, friends, staff, and fellow Idahoans.

Craig's arrest provoked a small flurry of attention to that earlier scandal, and it was suggested that Craig had absorbed a lesson from it: "sexual misconduct—or even the mere perception that one is gay—could ruin a man's reputation. But steadfast, straight-in-the-eye denial just might get him off the hook."

Craig claimed that his state of mind was troubled at the time of the guilty plea because he and his family "[had] been relentlessly and viciously harassed" by the Idaho Statesman in the course of its investigation into allegations of Craig's homosexuality. On August 30, the Statesman called for Craig's resignation. In response to questions about the arrest, the Minneapolis–St. Paul Airport Police Department released an audiotape of Craig's interview with Sergeant Dave Karsnia, the arresting officer. In that interview, Craig denied wrongdoing and claimed that he was a victim of entrapment.

Craig was one of two Senate liaisons for Mitt Romney's 2008 presidential campaign, but removed himself from that campaign role after the conviction became public. Romney said of Craig, "He's disappointed the American people." Craig later expressed bitterness about Romney's handling of the incident, saying in an interview with Matt Lauer, "And [Romney] not only threw me under his campaign bus, he backed up and ran over me again."

A Washington watchdog group, Citizens for Responsibility and Ethics in Washington, filed a complaint with the Senate Ethics Committee requesting an investigation into whether Craig violated Senate Rules of Conduct. Members of the Republican Party in Congress began calling for Craig to resign, including Representative Pete Hoekstra (MI), Senator John McCain (AZ), Senator Norm Coleman (MN) and Senator John Ensign (NV). Coleman and Senator Susan Collins (ME) announced that they would donate campaign contributions received from Craig's political action committee to charity. Senator Patrick Leahy (D-VT), and sitting chair of the Judiciary Committee, criticized the Republicans for holding to a double standard, for not having called likewise for the resignation of Senator David Vitter (R-LA), accused in a call girl scandal. Leahy said further that the Republicans were motivated by politics, in that Craig would be replaced by a Republican governor while Vitter would be replaced by a Democratic governor. Ensign, for the Republicans, denied the double standard, saying on ABC that Craig had pleaded guilty to a crime while Vitter was only accused. Senator Arlen Specter, then (R-PA), encouraged Craig to fight to withdraw his guilty plea, concluding on Fox News Sunday "I think he could be vindicated."

Senate GOP leaders including Mitch McConnell (KY) and Trent Lott (MS) asked Craig to "temporarily step down as the top Republican on the Veterans Affairs Committee, Appropriations Subcommittee on the Interior and Energy and Natural Resources Subcommittee on Public Lands and Forests." Craig subsequently agreed to step down from those posts as the ranking Minority member. Patrick Sammon, president of the Log Cabin Republicans, issued a statement condemning the senator's actions.

Resignation announcement/reversal, and motion to withdraw plea
At a news conference on September 1, 2007, Craig announced his intent to resign, "with sadness and deep regret", effective September 30, 2007. On September 4, 2007, a spokesperson for Craig indicated that he was reconsidering his decision to resign, if his conviction was rapidly overturned and his committee assignments were restored.

On September 10, 2007, Craig's attorneys filed a motion to withdraw his guilty plea, arguing that it "was not knowing and intelligent and therefore was in violation of his constitutional rights." His lawyers further argued that Craig "felt compelled to grasp the lifeline," hoping that if he were to submit to an interview and plead guilty that none of the allegations would be made public. The motion argued that Craig had entered the plea under stress caused by media inquiries into his sexuality. The American Civil Liberties Union (ACLU) filed an amicus curiae brief stating that the secret sting operation used by the police was not "carefully crafted" to avoid ensnaring innocent speech and that "the defendant should be permitted to withdraw his plea, and, should the state recharge him, to contest the constitutional validity of any prosecution."

Craig's motion hearing to withdraw his guilty plea was held on September 26, 2007, before Judge Charles A. Porter, Jr. Craig's Washington D.C. attorney, William Martin, argued that Craig's actions could not be considered disorderly conduct because "you should have either touching, or words, or a combination of the two." The other main argument was made by Craig's Minneapolis attorney, Thomas Kelly, who argued that the mail-in petition used by Craig was "defective" because it lacked a judge's signature. On September 26, 2007, Craig released a statement that he would remain in office until the Hennepin County District Court judge ruled on his motion to withdraw his guilty plea.

On October 4, 2007, Porter denied Craig's motion to withdraw his guilty plea, ruling that Craig's plea was accurate, voluntary, intelligent and that evidence supported the conviction. As part of Craig's appeal of this ruling, the ACLU filed a brief that cited a Minnesota Supreme Court ruling from 38 years earlier finding that those engaging in sexual encounters in closed stalls in otherwise public restrooms "have a reasonable expectation of privacy," a finding that the ACLU argued would contradict the state's claim that Craig was inviting the undercover officer to have sex "in public."

After Judge Porter's ruling, Craig announced that despite his pledge to the contrary, he would serve out his Senate term. He stated that he intended to "continue my effort to clear my name in the Senate Ethics Committee—something that is not possible if I am not serving in the Senate." Craig did not run for re-election in 2008 and left office on January 3, 2009. He was succeeded by Republican Jim Risch, the Lieutenant Governor of Idaho.

In September 2008, Craig's attorney argued before a three-judge panel of the Minnesota Court of Appeals that there was insufficient evidence to find Craig guilty of a misdemeanor. In December 2008, the appellate court rejected this attempt to have the guilty plea tossed out and rejected the constitutional challenge to the charges.

On January 8, 2009, Craig dropped his appeal to the Minnesota State Supreme Court after his attorney determined that the Court would be unlikely to accept a petition for further review of the case, ending the legal challenge to his guilty plea.

Gay men allege sexual contact with Craig
In December 2007, eight gay men came forward to the Idaho Statesman newspaper alleging either sexual encounters with Craig or attempts by Craig to engage in sexual encounters. Four of the men gave the newspaper graphic, recorded details of their alleged sexual encounters. One of the four was Mike Jones, the male escort who in November 2006 had been involved in a sex and methamphetamine scandal with Ted Haggard. Jones claimed that Craig had paid him $200 for a massage and oral sex. A Craig spokesman responded, "Mike Jones is lying in order to sell his book [about Ted Haggard]—plain and simple. Larry has never met Mike Jones."

Use of campaign funds for legal defense

February 2008 Senate Ethics Committee letter
On February 13, 2008, the Senate Ethics Committee sent a letter of admonition to Craig, stating that his "improper conduct" reflected "discreditably" on the United States Senate. The Committee held that Craig had indeed committed the actions for which he had pleaded guilty, and that his efforts to withdraw his guilty plea were intended to evade the repercussions of his actions. Noting that Craig had tapped campaign funds to spend $213,000 for legal fees and public relations fees on the case, the Committee argued that this showed his disregard of ethics. Campaign funds may only pay legal bills when they are related to the senator's official duties.

2012 FEC lawsuit
In June 2012, the Federal Election Commission sued Craig for repayment of $217,000 of campaign funds plus fines of $6,500 from the former Senator and his treasurer, Kaye O'Riordan. Craig used the money to pay for his defense in the case. In an August 2012 filing, Craig's lawyer Andrew Herman wrote "Not only was the trip itself constitutionally required, but Senate rules sanction reimbursement for any cost relating to a senator's use of a bathroom while on official travel"; the filing cited an FEC ruling that allowed former Congressman Jim Kolbe to use campaign funds for his legal defense in the Mark Foley scandal. In March 2013, the court found "expenditures for legal fees" unqualified as "ordinary and necessary expenses in connection with Mr. Craig's duties as a federal officeholder and... irrespective of his duties as an officeholder."

Craig appealed to the United States Court of Appeals for the District of Columbia Circuit. On March 4, 2016, the Court of Appeals upheld the lower court ruling and ordered Craig to pay $242,533 to the United States Treasury Department.

In popular culture
Both the 2009 documentary Outrage and Newsweeks June 7, 2010, issue's Back Story listed Craig as one of several prominent conservative politicians who had a record of anti-gay legislation and was later caught in a gay sex scandal.

The stall (second from right) at the Minneapolis–St. Paul Airport bathroom in which the incident occurred gained notoriety. The restroom was later demolished.

Craig's airport men's room arrest is used in a "ripped from the headlines" episode of Law & Order—episode 6 of Season 18 ("Political Animal") in the long-running television series. A New York City councilman is shown "foot tapping" and runs his hand under the wall of the stall occupied by Lupo (Jeremy Sisto). Lupo subsequently arrests the councilman who later loudly declares "I am not gay!" to some assembled reporters, much like Craig did.

Similarly, in December 2007 an episode of Boston Legal-episode 8 of season 4 ("Oral Contracts") was based on this scandal, in which William Shatner's character Denny Crane was arrested for solicitation in a bathroom, because of tapping in a stall while constipated. Craig's name is directly referenced.

Robert Lund and M. Spaff Sumsion's 2007 CD Politicked Off! had a parody of J. Geils Band's "Centerfold", entitled "My Men's Room Date's a Senator", which refers to the incident.

The TV series According to Jim episode "The Rendezvous" (2008) features title character Jim setting up to meet his beloved wife Cheryl at the airport hotel to have a quickie before she leaves to aid her ailing mother. While in the airport bathroom Jim accidentally taps the shoe of the occupant in the next stall, then asks for some toilet paper by sliding his hand under the stall. He then has a police badge flashed at him from the adjacent stall and is promptly in trouble. 

The Broadway musical Spamalot  produced a comedic climatic skit, with the  knights peeling off their armor to reveal tutus and singing and dancing to "Wide Stance."

The 2018 film Deadpool 2 references the incident.

Comedian Charlie Berens referenced the incident in his 2023 special "Midwest Goodbye" describing a situation which might lead to nervousness where his "toe starts tapping like I'm an Idaho Senator in a Minneapolis bathroom." Then adding, "That joke's from 2007, you're welcome."

See also 
 Lawrence v. Texas

References

2007 in American politics
Congressional scandals
LGBT history in the United States
LGBT in Idaho
LGBT in Minnesota
Federal political sex scandals in the United States
Minneapolis–Saint Paul International Airport
2007 in LGBT history
LGBT-related political scandals